Rules of Engagement is a 2000 American war legal drama film, directed by William Friedkin, written by Stephen Gaghan,  from a story by Jim Webb, and starring Tommy Lee Jones and Samuel L. Jackson. Jackson plays U.S. Marine Colonel Terry Childers, who is brought to court-martial after soldiers under his orders kill several civilians outside the U.S. embassy in Yemen.

Plot

In 1968 during the Vietnam War, a disastrous American advance leaves U.S. Marine Lieutenant Hayes Hodges wounded and his men dead. His fellow platoon leader Lieutenant Terry Childers executes a North Vietnamese prisoner to intimidate a captive officer into calling off a mortar attack on Hodges' position; sparing the officer's life, Childers rescues Hodges. In 1996, Hodges, now a colonel, is set to retire after 28 years as a JAG officer. At his pre-retirement party at the Camp Lejeune Officers Club, he is honored by his old friend, Colonel Terry Childers, now the commanding officer of a Marine Expeditionary Unit.

Childers and his unit are deployed to Southwest Asia as part of an Amphibious Readiness Group, called to evacuate the U.S. Ambassador to Yemen when a routine anti-American demonstration at the embassy erupts in rock-throwing, Molotov cocktails, and gunfire. Escorting Ambassador Mourain and his family safely to a helicopter, Childers retrieves the embassy's American flag. Under heavy fire from snipers on nearby rooftops, three Marines are killed, and Childers orders his men to open fire on the crowd, resulting in the deaths of 83 irregular Yemeni soldiers and civilians, including children; the remaining Marines and embassy staff are saved.

U.S. National Security Advisor Bill Sokal pressures the military to court-martial Childers, hoping to salvage American relations in the Middle East by placing all blame for the incident on the colonel. Childers asks Hodges to serve as his defense attorney, and he reluctantly accepts. Hodges rejects a plea deal from the prosecutor, Major Biggs, who is convinced of Childers' guilt but privately refuses to consider the death penalty. With little time to prepare a defense, Hodges goes to Yemen, where witnesses and police claim that the Marines fired first on the unarmed crowd. Visiting the abandoned embassy and some of the wounded, he notices an undamaged security camera and scattered audio cassette tapes.

Returning to the U.S., Hodges confronts Childers about the complete lack of evidence to support his version of events, resulting in a fistfight. Sokal burns a videotape revealing the crowd was armed and fired on the Marines, and forces Mourain to lie on the stand that the crowd was peaceful, and that Childers ignored his orders and was violent and disrespectful to him and his family. Hodges meets with Mourain's wife, who admits Childers acted valiantly but refuses to testify. Captain Lee, who hesitated to follow Childers' order, is unable to testify to having seen gunfire from the crowd. A Yemeni doctor testifies that the tapes Hodges found are propaganda inciting violence against Americans, but declares the protest was peaceful.

With Sokal on the stand, Hodges presents a shipping manifest proving that the tape from the undamaged camera – the tape Sokal burned – was delivered to Sokal's office but disappeared, with footage that would likely have exonerated Childers. Taking the stand, Childers explains that he was the only surviving Marine able to see the crowd was armed. On cross-examination, Biggs goads Childers into admitting that he ordered his men to open fire by shouting "waste the motherfuckers". Childers loses his temper, declaring that he would not sacrifice the lives of his men to appease the likes of Biggs, to Hodges' dismay.

The prosecution presents Colonel Binh Le Cao, the Vietnamese officer whose life he spared, as a rebuttal witness, testifying that Childers executed an unarmed prisoner of war. During Hodges' cross-examination, Cao agrees that Childers took action to save American lives, and that if circumstances were reversed, Cao would have done the same. After the trial, Hodges confronts Sokal about the missing tape, vowing to uncover the truth. Childers is found guilty of the minor charge of breach of peace, but cleared of conduct unbecoming an officer, and murder; Biggs approaches Hodges about investigating Childers' actions in Vietnam, but Hodges declines to testify. Leaving the courthouse, Cao and Childers salute each other.

An epilogue reveals that Sokal was found guilty of destroying evidence and Mourain of perjury, both losing their jobs, while Childers retired honorably.

Cast

In addition, Baoan Coleman portrays retired NVA Colonel Binh Le Cao, while G. Gordon Liddy has a cameo as a talk show host.

Production

Development
The script was based on an original screenplay by James Webb, who developed it alongside producer Scott Rudin, with Sylvester Stallone in talks to star in the film.William Friedkin was hired to direct, but had trouble collaborating with Webb on script rewrites. Rudin passed the project over to Richard Zanuck, who then hired Stephen Gaghan to work on the screenplay. Webb hated Gaghan's work and frustrated the filmmaker's attempts to receive cooperation from the Department of Defense, which was eventually obtained nonetheless.

Filming
Location shooting took place in Morocco, Nokesville, Virginia, Warrenton, Virginia (military base scenes), Hunting Island, South Carolina (Vietnam scenes), and Mount Washington, Virginia (Gen. Hodges' estate scenes).

Reception

Critical response
The site's critical consensus reads: "The script is unconvincing and the courtroom action is unengaging." On Metacritic it has a score of 45% based on reviews from 31 critics, indicating "mixed or average reviews". Audiences surveyed by CinemaScore gave the film a grade "A-" on scale of A to F.

Roger Ebert  of the Chicago Sun-Times, gave it two and a half out of four stars, praising its "expert melodrama" while criticizing an "infuriating screenplay".
Peter Bradshaw of The Guardian wrote that the film was "lazily plotted, grotesquely dishonest, and dripping with a creepy strain of Islamophobia". 
Charles Gittins, writing from a legal perspective for CNN, wrote that "the movie succeeds in capturing the details of a successful military operation and showing the possible political fallout from such an operation. The drama lags, however, once it enters the courtroom where Rules of Engagement is neither accurate nor compelling."

The American-Arab Anti-Discrimination Committee described it as "probably the most racist film ever made against Arabs by Hollywood", comparing it with The Birth of a Nation and The Eternal Jew. Director William Friedkin, dismissed accusations that the film was racist:
Let me state right up front, the film is not anti-Arab, is not anti-Muslim and is certainly not anti-Yemen. In order to make the film in Morocco, the present King of Morocco had to read the script and approve it and sign his name ... and nobody participating from the Arab side of things felt that the film was anti-Arab. The film is anti-terrorist. It takes a strong stand against terrorism and it says that terrorism wears many faces ... but we haven't made this film to slander the government of Yemen. It's a democracy and I don't believe for a moment they support terrorists any more than America does.

Friedkin later stated the film "was a box office hit but many critics saw it as jingoism". He says that James Webb later saw the film on the recommendation of his friend Colonel David Hackworth; Webb then rang Friedkin to say how much he liked it.

See also
 Trial movies

References

 Friedkin, William, The Friedkin Connection, Harper Collins 2013

Further reading

External links

 
 
 
 

2000 films
2000 drama films
2000s legal films
2000s mystery films
American legal drama films
American mystery films
American political drama films
Films directed by William Friedkin
Military courtroom films
Films shot in Morocco
Films shot in Virginia
Films shot in South Carolina
Films set in Yemen
Paramount Pictures films
Films about the United States Marine Corps
Vietnam War films
The Zanuck Company films
Films produced by Scott Rudin
Films with screenplays by Stephen Gaghan
Films produced by Richard D. Zanuck
Films scored by Mark Isham
2000s English-language films
2000s American films
Race-related controversies in film